Shannon Hale (née Shannon Bryner; born January 26, 1974) is an American author primarily of young adult fantasy, including the Newbery Honor book Princess Academy and The Goose Girl. Her first novel for adults, Austenland, was adapted into a film in 2013. She is a graduate of the University of Utah and the University of Montana. She has also co-written with her husband, Dean.

Early life
Hale was born on January 26, 1974, in Salt Lake City to Wallace and Bonnie Bryner. She is the middle child of five children; she has two older sisters, one younger sister, and one younger brother. She enjoyed writing, reading, and acting as a young girl; she often created plays that she would act out with friends. She also began to write fantasy books at age 10, often featuring herself as the protagonist. Her elementary school teachers encouraged her creative endeavors, and, in the fourth grade, Hale announced that she wanted to be a writer as an adult. In junior high, she participated on the school literary magazine. She then attended West High School, where she cultivated passions for English and drama. She took a creative writing class and worked as an editor of fiction for her high school's literary magazine. She participated in both school and community theater productions, including The Secret Garden. Hale also took part in drama competitions and traveled throughout Utah and the U.S. with an improvisational theater group whose productions highlighted a range of teen issues. She met her spouse, Dean Hale, freshman year at West High School; he was also involved in theater. Hale has said that her theater experience has improved her writing skills, particularly in character creation and world building.

She attended the University of Utah, primarily majoring in both English and Theater before deciding solely to pursue the former. She served as a missionary for the Church of Jesus Christ of Latter-day Saints in Paraguay for 18 months before graduating with a bachelor's degree in English from the University of Utah in 1998. She later earned a master's degree in Creative Writing from the University of Montana. While studying at the University of Montana, Hale wrote 100 short stories and submitted many for publication, but none were accepted.

Writing
Hale began writing The Goose Girl while in her graduate writing program, and worked on her drafts of it during her lunch break while working at her instructional design job. She originally planned to work in literary fiction, publishing short stories and teaching English, before writing young adult and children's books. The Goose Girl became her first published novel after being met with nine rejections; Hale received an offer in 2003 from Bloomsbury Publishing. She based the book on her favorite fairy tale of the same name. It was named an ALA Teens' Top Ten and became the first of many novels in Hale's Books of Bayern series. The Goose Girl also won the 2004 Josette Frank Award for fiction and was reprinted by Bloomsbury in 2017. Hundreds of thousands of copies of the novel have been printed in a total of fifteen languages. The other Books of Bayern include Enna Burning, River Secrets, and Forest Born.

Her novel Princess Academy was featured on The New York Times Best Seller list, as well as that of Book Sense and Publishers Weekly. It also received a Newbery Honor. Hale said that receiving the award was an "unexpected gift" that has profoundly affected her career. After the positive response from readers and reviewers alike to Princess Academy, Hale wrote its sequel, Princess Academy: Palace of Stone. In 2015 she continued the story with a third installment, Princess Academy: The Forgotten Sisters. Hale has remarked that the series is "a love letter to education".

Her first adult novel, Austenland, was also featured by Book Sense. Hale and screenwriter Jerusha Hess then wrote the screenplay for a film adaptation of Austenland, released in 2013 at the Sundance Film Festival. It was then bought by Sony Pictures for $4 million. Twilight author Stephenie Meyer produced the film and Keri Russell starred as protagonist Jane Hayes. In 2012 Hale released a sequel novel, Midnight in Austenland. Another adult novel, The Actor and the Housewife, was published in 2009 and was named "the City Weekly readers' choice winner for best novel of the year". Hale has kept numerous rejection letters she has received from publishers, and has compiled them into one 60 foot long scroll.

In 2017, Hale released a graphic memoir entitled Real Friends, chronicling her struggles in grade school. It was illustrated by LeUyen Pham. Its sequel, Best Friends, appeared on The New York Times Best Seller list for graphic books and manga in April 2020. In 2018, her Princess in Black series—which she wrote with her husband, Dean Hale—made The New York Times Best Seller list for children's series. The two also co-wrote the graphic novel Rapunzel's Revenge, as well as two young adult novels for the Marvel superheroes Squirrel Girl and Captain Marvel. Hale ventured further into science fiction with her own YA superhero novel, Dangerous, in 2014.

Other work 
Before becoming a full-time author, Hale participated in stage and improvisational comedy, studied in Mexico and the United Kingdom, and worked as an instructional designer.

She is an advocate for gender equality; she has noticed how her books are marketed only to girls, despite positive reception from both genders. She has written a few articles about this subject.

Personal life
Hale is married to Dean C. Hale, with whom she has co-authored the Eisner-nominee graphic novels Rapunzel's Revenge and Calamity Jack, as well as The Princess in Black series and The Unbeatable Squirrel Girl series.

She is a former member of the Church of Jesus Christ of Latter-day Saints (LDS Church). In a 2014 interview, Hale said that she doesn't "consciously make storytelling choices based on the [LDS] Church". In writing her graphic novel memoirs of her childhood, Hale decided to include visual references to her religious upbringing, like her family attending church. Despite being asked to remove the references, Hale decided to retain them, stating that "to erase [them] felt like a lie". 

She is the mother of four children: Max, Magnolia, and twin girls Dinah and Wren. Hale has noted that her children give her new ideas for books "probably every day".

Works

The Books of Bayern seriesThe Goose Girl (2003), 
Enna Burning (2004), 
River Secrets (2006), 
Forest Born (2009), Princess Academy seriesPrincess Academy (2005),  - adapted to a musical produced by Kensington Theatre in December 2016
Princess Academy: Palace of Stone (2012), 
Princess Academy: The Forgotten Sisters (2015), Austenland seriesAustenland (2007),  - premiered as a movie in January 2013
Midnight in Austenland (2012), Rapunzel's Revenge seriesCo-authored with Dean Hale and illustrated by Nathan Hale (no relation)
Rapunzel's Revenge (2008), 
Calamity Jack (2010), Ever After High seriesEver After High: The Storybook of Legends (2013), 
Ever After High: The Unfairest of Them All (2014), 
Ever After High: A Wonderlandiful World (2014), 
Once Upon a Time: A Story Collection (2014), 
Monster High/Ever After High: The Legend of Shadow High (2017), Princess in Black seriesCo-authored with Dean Hale, and illustrated by LeUyen Pham
The Princess in Black (2014), 
The Perfect Princess Party (2015), 
The Hungry Bunny Horde (2016), 
Takes a Vacation (2016), 
The Mysterious Playdate (2017), 
The Science Fair Scare (2018), 
The Bathtime Battle (2020),  
The Giant Problem (2020),  
The Case of The Coronavirus (2020), digital booklet
And the Mermaid Princess (2021), The Unbeatable Squirrel Girl seriesCo-authored with Dean Hale
The Unbeatable Squirrel Girl: Squirrel Meets World  (2017), 
The Unbeatable Squirrel Girl: 2 Fuzzy, 2 Furious (2018), Real Friends seriesGraphic memoirs illustrated by LeUyen Pham

 Real Friends (2017), 
 Best Friends (2019),  
Friends Forever (2021), Standalone novelsBook of a Thousand Days (2007), 
The Actor and the Housewife (2009), 
Dangerous (2014), 
Kind of a Big Deal (2020), Short stories"Bouncing the Grinning Goat" from Guys Read: Other Worlds (2013)Diana: Princess of the Amazons series

Co-authored with Dean Hale and illustrated by Victoria Ying

 Diana: Princess of the Amazons (2020)

Articles 

 What are we teaching boys when we discourage them from reading books about girls?  for The Washington Post

Other

 Spirit Animals Book 4: Fire and Ice (2014)  
Itty-Bitty Kitty Corn (2021), picture book illustrated by LeUyen Pham

Awards and honors

2004 Josette Frank Award, Goose Girl
2004 AML Award in Young Adult Literature for Enna Burning
2005 AML Award  in Young Adult Literature for Princess Academy
2006 Newbery Honor, Princess Academy
2007 Whitney Award, Book of a Thousand Days
2007 Cybils Award for Young Adult Fantasy and Science Fiction, Book of a Thousand Days
In February 2016 Shannon was a Literary Guest of Honor and Keynote Speaker at the 34th annual Life, the Universe, & Everything professional science fiction and fantasy arts symposium.
2017 AML Award in Comics for Real Friends with LeUyen Pham
2021 AML Award in Comics for Friends Forever with LeUyen Pham

References

External links
 
 Little Red Reading Hood (fan site)
 Interview by Miss Erin
 Interview by Chris Rettstatt
 Q&A with Shannon Hale interview at Publishers Weekly

 

1974 births
20th-century Mormon missionaries
21st-century American novelists
21st-century American women writers
American children's writers
American women children's writers
American fantasy writers
Latter Day Saints from Utah
American Mormon missionaries in Paraguay
American women novelists
Living people
Newbery Honor winners
People from South Jordan, Utah
University of Montana alumni
University of Utah alumni
Novelists from Utah
Women science fiction and fantasy writers
Female Mormon missionaries
Harold B. Lee Library-related 21st century articles